The  is one of eight active brigades of the Japan Ground Self-Defense Force. The brigade is subordinated to the Central Army and is headquartered in Kaita, Hiroshima. Its responsibility is the defense of the Chūgoku region.

The brigade was formed on 29 March 1999 with units from the disbanded 13th Infantry Division.

Organization
13th Brigade, in Kaita
 13th Brigade HQ, in Kaita
 13th Tank Company, in Nagi (to be disbanded)
 8th Infantry Regiment, in Yonago, with 1x headquarters, 3x infantry, and 1x 120mm mortar company
 17th Infantry Regiment, in Yamaguchi, with 1x headquarters, 3x infantry, and 1x 120mm mortar company
 46th Infantry Regiment, in Kaita, with 1x headquarters, 3x infantry, and 1x 120mm mortar company
 13th Artillery Battalion, in Nagi, with three batteries of FH-70 155mm towed howitzers
 13th Reconnaissance Company, in Izumo, with Type 87 armored reconnaissance vehicle
 13th Anti-Aircraft Artillery Company, in Nagi
 13th Combat Engineer Company, in Kaita
 13th Signal Company, in Kaita
 13th Aviation Squadron, in Hōfu, flying UH-1J and OH-6D helicopters
 13th NBC-defense Company, in Kaita
 13th Logistic Support Battalion, in Kaita

External links
Homepage 13th Brigade (Japanese)

Japan Ground Self-Defense Force Brigade
Military units and formations established in 1999
1999 establishments in Japan